Porter Creek Centre is an electoral district which returns a member (known as an MLA) to the Legislative Assembly of Yukon, Canada. It was created in 2002 out of the Whitehorse ridings of Porter Creek North and Porter Creek South. It encompasses the Whitehorse subdivision of Whistle Bend and part of the subdivision of Porter Creek. It is bordered by the ridings of Porter Creek South, Porter Creek North, and Riverdale North.

Members of the Legislative Assembly

Election results

2021 general election

2016 general election

|-

| Liberal
| Paolo Gallina
| align="right"| 452
| align="right"| 43.3%
| align="right"| +11.7%

| NDP
| Pat Berrel
| align="right"| 213
| align="right"| 20.4%
| align="right"| -9.3%

|-
! align=left colspan=3|Total
! align=right| 1044
! align=right| 100.0%
! align=right|
|}

2011 general election

|-

| Liberal
|Kerry Huff
| align="right"| 245
| align="right"| 31.6%
| align="right"| +0.8%

| NDP
| Jean-François Des Lauriers
| align="right"| 230
| align="right"| 29.7%
| align="right"| +7.8%
|-
! align=left colspan=3|Total
! align=right| 773
! align=right| 100.0%
! align=right| –
|}

2006 general election

|-

 
|Liberal
|David Laxton
|align="right"|224
|align="right"|30.8%
|align="right"|-9.5%
|-

|NDP
|Kate White
|align="right"|159
|align="right"|21.9%
|align="right"|+13.8%
|- bgcolor="white"
!align="left" colspan=3|Total
!align="right"|727
!align="right"|100.0%
!align="right"| –

2002 general election

|-

 
|Liberal
|Scott Kent
|align="right"|312
|align="right"|40.3%
|align="right"| –
|-

|NDP
|Judi Johnny
|align="right"|63
|align="right"|8.1%
|align="right"| –
|- bgcolor="white"
!align="left" colspan=3|Total
!align="right"|774
!align="right"|100.0%
!align="right"| –

References

Yukon territorial electoral districts
Politics of Whitehorse